The 1929 Delaware State Hornets football team represented Delaware State University in the 1929 college football season as an independent. Delaware State compiled a 1–0 record, winning their only game 12–7 against Cheyney.

Schedule

References

Delaware State
Delaware State Hornets football seasons
College football undefeated seasons
Delaware State Hornets football